Coleophora lusciniaepennella is a moth of the family Coleophoridae. It is found in most of Europe, except the Iberian Peninsula, the Mediterranean islands and most of the Balkan Peninsula and Russia. It occurs in forest-steppe biotopes.

It is a nondescript plain fuscous or ochreous-brown species only reliably identified by dissection and microscopic examination of the genitalia. The moth flies from June to July depending on the location.

The larvae feed on Myrica gale, Populus tremula, Salix alba, Salix aurita, Salix babylonica, Salix caprea, Salix cinerea, Salix dasyclados, Salix fragilis, Salix glabra, Salix pentandra, Salix repens, Salix triandra and Salix viminalis. It is rather strongly compressed and keeled and has a mouth angle of 30-45°. Full-grown larvae can be found at the end of May.

References

External links

 Coleophora lusciniaepennella at UKmoths
 Lepiforum.de

lusciniaepennella
Moths described in 1833
Moths of Europe
Taxa named by Georg Friedrich Treitschke